Ashley Graham may refer to:

 Ashley Graham (rugby league) (born 1984), Australian NRL player
 Ashley Graham (model) (born 1987), American model
 Ashley Graham (Resident Evil), a fictional character in the Resident Evil series